Lees Mill (also Balmoral) is an unincorporated community in the town of Moultonborough, in Carroll County, New Hampshire, United States. It is located adjacent to the outlet of Lees Pond, directly upstream from the northernmost point of Lake Winnipesaukee.

References

Unincorporated communities in Carroll County, New Hampshire
Unincorporated communities in New Hampshire
Moultonborough, New Hampshire